The 2017 season is Associação Portuguesa de Desportos' ninety fifth season in existence and the club's first consecutive season in the fourth level of Brazilian football.

Players

Squad information

Note: List of registered players according to FPF

Appearances and goals

Last updated: 29 June 2017
Source: Match reports in Competitive matches, Soccerway

Goalscorers

Last updated: 5 June 2017
Source: Match reports in Competitive matches

Disciplinary record

As of 29 June 2017
Source: Match reports in Competitive matches
 = Number of bookings;  = Number of sending offs after a second yellow card;  = Number of sending offs by a direct red card.

Managers

Transfers

In

Total spending:  R$ 0.00

Out

Total gaining:  R$ 0.00

Balance
R$ 0.00

Notes

Competitions

Campeonato Brasileiro Série D

Matches

Campeonato Paulista Série A2

Matches

Copa do Brasil

References

External links
Official Site 
NETLusa - blog 

2017 season
Associação Portuguesa de Desportos seasons
Brazilian football clubs 2017 season